In United States aviation, tower en route control (TEC) is a collection of published low-altitude, short-distance IFR routes through large metropolitan areas that require  no level of air traffic control higher than approach-control facilities.

Overview

TEC routing is intended to better distribute the load of traffic coordination over different ATC facilities and levels by allowing low-altitude IFR traffic engaged in short flights within congested areas to conduct the entire flight under the control of approach-control or lower levels of ATC.  Aircraft flying TEC routes can complete an entire flight without the need to contact major air traffic control centers.  Prepared TEC routes have been published for turbojet and lighter aircraft between major airports within large and congested airspaces.

See also

Air Traffic Control
Instrument Flight Rules

External links 
NFDC Preferred Routes Database - database of TEC routes and other routes (U.S.)

Air traffic control